Christopher Joyce is an Irish hurler who plays for Cork Senior Championship club Na Piarsaigh. He usually lines out as a right wing-back. Joyce is a former member of the Cork senior hurling team.

Playing career

Na Piarsaigh

Joyce joined the Na Piarsaigh club at a young age and enjoyed some success at juvenile and underage levels, including winning a Féile na nGael title in 2006 after a 1-05 to 1-04 defeat of Athenry in the final.

On 7 December 2013, Joyce enjoyed his first success at adult level when he was at centre-back for Na Piarsaigh's 0-20 to 2-09 Cork Senior Hurling League final defeat of Sarsfields.

Cork

Minor & under-21

Joyce first played for Cork as a member of the minor team. He made his first appearance on 24 June 2009 when he was introduced as a 59th-minute substitute for clubmate Patrick O'Rourke in a 5-17 apiece Munster Championship draw with Tipperary. Joyce ended his tenure at minor level following a 2-17 to 1-13 defeat by Waterford on 7 July 2010.

On 15 July 2011, Joyce made his debut in the under-21 grade in a 4-19 to 1-21 defeat of Tipperary. He was at right corner-back in the subsequent 1-27 to 4-20 Munster final defeat by Limerick.

Joyce captained the Cork under-21 team on 17 July 2013. The 5-19 to 2-13 defeat by Tipperary was his last game in the grade.

Senior

On 7 July 2012 Joyce made his senior championship debut in a 1-26 to 2-16 defeat of Offaly in the All-Ireland qualifiers. He became Cork's first choice centre-back for the championship the following year, lining out in his first Munster decider, however, Cork faced a 0-24 to 0-15 defeat by Limerick.  On 8 September 2013 Joyce lined out against Clare in his first All-Ireland final. Three second-half goals through Conor Lehane, Anthony Nash and Pa Cronin, and a tenth point of the game from Patrick Horgan gave Cork a one-point lead as injury time came to an end. A last-gasp point from corner-back Domhnall O'Donovan earned Clare a 0-25 to 3-16 draw. The replay on 28 September was regarded as one of the best in recent years. Clare's Shane O'Donnell was a late addition to the team, and went on to score a hat-trick of goals in the first nineteen minutes of the game. Patrick Horgan top scored for Cork, however, further goals from Conor McGrath and Darach Honan secured a 5-16 to 3-16 victory for Clare.

In 2014 Joyce won his first Munster medal as goals by Séamus Harnedy and Paudie O'Sullivan gave Cork a 2-24 to 0-24 victory over Limerick in the provincial decider.

Joyce won his second Munster Championship medal on 9 July 2017 when he played at right wing-back in Cork's 1-25 to 1-20 defeat of Clare in the final.

On 1 July 2018, Joyce won a third Munster Championship medal following a 2-24 to 3-19 defeat of Clare in the final.

On 7 December 2020, it was reported in the Irish Examiner that Joyce would not be involved with the Cork senior hurling team for the 2021 season.

Career statistics

Honours

Na Piarsaigh
Cork Senior Hurling League (1): 2013
Féile na nGael (1): 2006

Cork
Munster Senior Hurling Championship (3): 2014, 2017, 2018

References

External links
Christopher Joyce profile at the Cork GAA website

Living people
Hurling backs
Na Piarsaigh hurlers
Cork inter-county hurlers
Year of birth missing (living people)